Haidee Wright (13 January 1867 – 29 January 1943), born as Ada Wright, was a London born English character actress. She began acting in plays in 1878 when a small child. She came from a family of actors and had a long career in the United Kingdom and the United States with much Broadway work with occasional parts in films. Her parents and many siblings were actors. One of her brothers was Huntley Wright.

Selected plays
The Passing of the Third Floor Back (1908)
The Royal Family (1927)

Partial filmography
 Evidence (1915)
 The Winning Goal (1920)
 Aunt Rachel (1920)
 Colonel Newcome (1920)
 Demos (1921)
 The Old Country (1921)
 The Glorious Adventure (1922)
 A Bachelor's Baby (1922)
 Paddy the Next Best Thing (1923)
 Strange Evidence (1933)
 The Blarney Stone (1933)
 Tomorrow We Live (1936)

References

External links

portrait in early role
findagrave

1867 births
1943 deaths
English stage actresses
English film actresses
English silent film actresses
Actresses from London
20th-century English actresses